Bath Crashers is a television show on the DIY Network that features host and licensed contractor Matt Muenster surprising home owners with a brand-new bathroom.
Like other "crasher" shows on the DIY Network, Muenster and his crew ambush homeowners while they are home improvement shopping, follow them back to their homes, tear apart their bathrooms and help them do a complete bathroom overhaul. Muenster was previously the host of BATHtastic, another DIY Network show.

Episodes

See also
 Candice Tells All
 Divine Design
 Fixer Upper
 Flip or Flop
 Income Property
 Love It or List It
 Property Brothers
 Take This House and Sell It
 Yard Crashers

References

External links
 DIY Network Page
 
 Matt Muenster Bio
Home renovation television series
2010 American television series debuts
DIY Network original programming